The 2002 Colorado Buffaloes football team represented the University of Colorado at Boulder during the 2002 NCAA Division I-A football season. The team played their home games at Folsom Field in Boulder, Colorado. They participated in the Big 12 Conference in the North Division. They were coached by head coach Gary Barnett. Colorado played in the Big 12 Championship Game for the second time, but lost to Oklahoma.

Schedule

Roster

Game summaries

USC

at UCLA

Kansas State

at Oklahoma

Iowa State

vs. Oklahoma (Big 12 Championship Game)

vs. Wisconsin (Alamo Bowl)

References

Colorado
Colorado Buffaloes football seasons
Colorado Buffaloes football